Don't Call Him a Cowboy is the forty-ninth studio album by American country music singer Conway Twitty. The album was released on June 15, 1985, by Warner Bros. Records.

Track listing

Personnel
Jimmy Capps - acoustic guitar
Hoot Hester - fiddle
John Hughey - steel guitar, dobro
David Hungate - bass guitar
Shane Keister - keyboards
Larry Keith - background vocals
Donna Rhodes - background vocals
Perry Rhodes - background vocals
James Stroud - drums, percussion
Conway Twitty - lead vocals, background vocals
Bobby Wood - keyboards
Reggie Young - electric guitar

Charts

Weekly charts

Year-end charts

References

1985 albums
Conway Twitty albums
Warner Records albums